The Theatres Act 1968 abolished censorship of the stage in the United Kingdom, receiving royal assent on 26 July 1968, after passing both Houses of Parliament.

Since 1737, scripts had been licensed for performance by the Lord Chamberlain's Office (under the Theatres Act 1843, a continuation of the Licensing Act 1737) a measure initially introduced to protect Robert Walpole's administration from political satire. By the late 19th century the Lord Chamberlain's Office had become the arbiter of moral taste on the stage, and the "Angry Young Men" of the 1950s were in some ways a reaction against the banality of the morally conservative and formally restricted period of theatre that had preceded them.

Theatre critic Kenneth Tynan, whilst working with Laurence Olivier as literary manager and Dramaturg of the National Theatre Company had been campaigning for liberalisation for many years. A prosecution had succeeded in 1966 against those responsible for producing  Edward Bond's play Saved at the Royal Court and John Osborne's play A Patriot for Me, cut by the censor, was put on at the Royal Court with the theatre turning itself into a private members' club. The strong response to these causes célèbres helped lead to the abolition of theatre censorship in Great Britain.

References

External links
Image of the Act on the UK Parliamentary website

Censorship in the United Kingdom
Theatre in the United Kingdom
United Kingdom Acts of Parliament 1968
1968 in theatre